Jessica Mary "Pixie" Fletcher ( – 29 July 1961) was a New Zealand hurdler who represented her country at the 1950 British Empire Games.

Biography
Fletcher was born in 1930 or 1931, the only child of George and Thelma May Fletcher. She excelled at sports, and held Wellington athletics centre records for both the 80 metres hurdles and the discus throw. She was also a provincial netball representative player.

She was subsequently selected for the New Zealand team for the Empire Games, to compete in the 80 metres hurdles; the discus throw was not a women's event at those games.

In the 80 metres hurdles at the Empire Games, Fletcher placed second in her heat in a time of 11.9 seconds, and progressed to the final, where she finished fifth.

From 1950 to 1955, Fletcher was a member of the Wellington representative netball team at the national championships. She was a schoolteacher, and after moving to work in Waikanae, she played for Horowhenua at the 1957 national netball championships. She subsequently became a netball coach.

Fletcher died in Palmerston North on 29 July 1961, aged 30, after a long illness, and was buried at Kelvin Grove Cemetery.

References

External links
 

1930s births
1961 deaths
Commonwealth Games competitors for New Zealand
Athletes (track and field) at the 1950 British Empire Games
New Zealand female hurdlers
New Zealand female discus throwers
New Zealand netball players
Burials at Kelvin Grove Cemetery